This is a list of Italian television related events from 1971.

Events 

 In 1971, RAI gets enormous public successes (Il segno del comando, E le stelle stanno a guardare, Canzonissima) and releases a miniseries in European co-production, shot by directors such as Rossellini, Rossi and Castellani. However, the firm is increasingly criticized for its poor management and the delay in the use of the color. It begins to suffer from competition with the foreign televisions channels of Switzerland and Yugoslavia.
 January 6: Massimo Ranieri wins Canzonissima with Vent’anni. 
 February 27: Nada and Nicola Di Bari win the Sanremo music festival with Il cuore è uno zingaro.
 May 6: In Yugoslavia, TV Koper-Capodistria, aimed at the Italian minority in Slovenia, begins to broadcast. Its signal is picked up also in Italy, from Friuli to Marche. Later its broadcoasting area  covers the whole country. The new channel has limited technical facilities, but broadcasts in PAL color (six years in advance on RAI). For this, it is welcomed by the Italian public and becomes a serious competitor for the state television, particularly in the broadcast of sport events.
 May 24: the cable television Telediffusione Italiana TeleNapoli makes the first color broadcast on Italy, received only in four Neapolitan cafes equipped with the appropriate sets. In the same year, Telediffussione shots in color all of  Cantagiro's stages.
July 27: RAI refuses to broadcast the scheduled interview Pier Paolo Pasolini by Enzo Biagi, for the program 3 B facciamo l’appello. At the time, Pasolini is in on trial for press crimes, as former director-in-chief of Lotta Continua. The show will be broadcast only four years later, after Pasolini's death.

Debuts

Serials 
 All'ultimo minuto (Last minute) – 3 season, directed by Ruggero Deodato; medium-length thrillers (30 minutes) about ordinary people involved in dramatic situations.

News 
 Nord chiama Sud, Sud chiama Nord (North calls South, South calls North) – magazine broadcast simultaneously from the Milan and Naples studios.

Television shows

Drama 
 Bernadette Devlin – by Silvio Maestranzi; with Anna Bonasso in the title role.
 La signora delle camelie (The lady of the camellias, from the Dumas son's drama) – by Vittorio Cottafavi, script by Maria Bellonci, with Rossella Falk in the title role.
 Tre donne (Three women) – a cycle of three TV dramas, directed by Alfredo Giannetti and all played by Anna Magnani. The great actress debuts on TV, getting a personal success, after a decades of relative decline. The three movies tell an history of Italy in feminine key, from the First world war (La sciantosa, The singer, with Massimo Ranieri) to the Resistance (1943 un incontro, 1943, a meeting, with Enrico Maria Salerno) to the boom (L’automobile, The car, with Vittorio Caprioli).
 La sostituzione (The replacement) – experimental science-fiction drama, directed by Franco Brogi Taviani (brother of Paolo and Vittorio).
 Oltre il duemila (Beyond 2000) – two science-fiction drama (The factory of man, The computer) by Piero Nelli.
Antigone – by Sophocles, directed by Vittorio Cottafavi, with Adriana Asti in the title role and Raoul Grassilli as Creon, shot among the ancient temples in Paestum; the director tries to bring in television the methods of the epic theater.

Miniserie 

 Astronave Terra (Spaceship Earth) – by Alberto Negrin ; biopic in two episodes about Rachel Carson (played by Edda Albertini). It is one of the first Italian TV shows dealing with ecological topics.
 Socrates – in two episodes; by Roberto Rossellini; first chapter of a biopics’ cycle about the great philosophers.
 Dedicato a un bambino (Dedicated to a child) – by Gianni Bongioanni; social drama about the problem children.
 I Buddenbrok – by Edmo Fenoglio; in seven episodes, from the Thomas Mann's novel; script by Italo Alighiero Chiusano, partly based to the BBC version of the book; with Paolo Stoppa (Jean), Nando Gazzolo (Tom), Glauco Mauri (Christian), Rina Morelli (Ida) and Valentina Cortese (Gerda). The production is, for the time, sumptuous, with a perfect reconstruction of the Buddenbrookhaus and costumes by the  designer Maria De Matteis. 
 E le stelle stanno a guardare – by Anton Giulio Majano; in nine episodes, from Cronin's The stars look down; with Giancarlo Giannini and Orso Maria Guerrini.
 Eneide – by Franco Rossi; in seven episodes, from the Virgil's poem the Aeneid; with Giulio Brogi (Aeneas) and Andrea Giordana (Turnus). Three years after L’odissea, Rossi realizes another quality peplum, spectacular (cinematography by Vittorio Storaro, costumes by Luciano Ricceri) but not without cultural depth. Giulio Brogi makes the protagonist a modern character, tormented and divided. The miniseries is later adapted for the big screen.
 Il mulino del Po second series (The mill on the Po) – by Sandro Bolchi, who had already directed the first series in 1963; in four episodes, from the second and third chapter of the Riccardo Bacchelli's trilogy; with Valeria Moriconi, Raoul Grassilli, Ottavia PIccolo and the singer Ornella Vanoni in the character role of a prostitute. 
 Riuscirà il cav. Papà Ubu? (Will Papa Ubu Esq. Succeed?) – version for kid of Alfred Jarry's cycle of Papa Ubu, played partly by actors (Renzo Palmer, Cochi e Renato), partly by puppets.
 Il segno del comando (The sign of the command) – in five episodes; by Daniele D’Anza, from a script of Giuseppe D’Agata (later adapted in a novel); with Ugo Pagliai, Carla Gravina, Massimo Girotti and Rossella Falk. First Italian fantastic thriller, on the example of French productions as Belphegor. An English scholar, in Rome for a conference, meets the ghost of a woman loved in a previous life and is involved in the chase for a powerful talisman. Thanks to a suggestive direction and a well-conceived plot, the miniseries gets at an unexpected success (fifteen millions viewers) and becomes in the years a cult object. 
 Vita di Leonardo  (The life of Leonardo da Vinci) – in five episodes; by Renato Castellani; with Philippe Leroy in the title role. Docudrama highly spectacular (the lost fresco The battle of Anghiari  is reconstructed for the shooting) but historically very accurate. An original idea is the insertion, in the Renaissance scene, of a teller modernly dressed (Giulio Bosetti) expressing the views of the author about the great artist.
 Come un uragano (Like a hurricane) – mystery in five episodes; by Silverio Blasi, from Francis Durbridge's Bat out of hell, with Alberto Lupo, Delia Boccardo and Corrado Pani. The last episode is seen by twenty-five million viewers (the best outcome for a mystery in history of Italian television).

Serials 
 Giallo di sera (Evening mystery) – by Guglielmo Morandi. Carlo Giuffrè plays the role of a Swiss police officer.

Variety 
 Canzonissima 1971 – directed by Eros Macchi; hosted by Corrado Mantoni and Raffaella Carrà, with the imitator Alighiero Noschese as guest of honor in every show, and won by Nicola Di Bari with Chitarra suona più piano (Guitar, play slower). Raffaella Carrà becomes a star of the little screen, also if her uncovered navel and her “tuca tuca” (a dance politely miming a petting, performed too in couple with Alberto Sordi) arouse some scandal. The show gets the record number of twenty-five million viewers.
 Come quando fuori piove (As when it's raining outside) and La freccia d’oro (The golden arrow) – game and music shows, broadcast the Sunday evening and hosted respectively by Raffaele Pisu and by Pippo Baudo and Loretta Goggi.
 Speciale per noi (Special for us) – directed by Antonello Falqui. Parody of a popular show for the young ones (Speciale per voi), with four elderly showmen (Aldo Fabrizi, Paolo Panelli, Bice Valori and Ave Ninchi) who do nothing to hide their age.
 Teatro 10 (second season) – directed by Antonello Falqui, hosted by Alberto Lupo, with many Italian and international stars as guest of honor. The show introduces Ike and Tina Turner and James Brown to the Italian public. The ending theme Parole parole parole, sung by Lupo and Mina, becomes a hit.
 Speciale 3 milioni (3 million special) – directed by Giancarlo Nicotra, musical show open air, aimed to the young ones, with the presence, besides the singers, of writers Giuseppe Berto and Erich Segal.
Per un gradino in più (For a step more) – by Marcello Marchesi.

News and educational 
 Terza B, facciamo l’appello (3B, let's make the roll call) – Enzo Biagi interviews famous personality together with their ancient schoolmates; particularly significant the dialog with Pasolini (see over).
Dal referendum alla costituzione, ovvero il 2 giugno (From Referendum to the Constitution: 2 June, celebrative documentary ) and I cavalieri di Malta (The Knights of Malta), - first and only works for television by Vittorio De Sica.The first one forms, with other two plays directed by Sandro Bolchi and Ermanno Olmi, a trilogy of celebrative docudramas aired for the 25th anniversary of the institutional referendum.
L’ultimo pianeta (The last planet) – in five episodes, by Gianluigi Poli. Enquiry about ecology, introduced by an Allen Ginsberg's poem.

Ending this year 
Mille e una sera

Deaths 

 22 January: Cesco Baseggio (73), actor.
 2 February: Nino Besozzi, (69), actor.
 27 October: Federico Zardi, (59), playwright and TV author.

References